Himerarctia viridisignata is a moth of the family Erebidae. It was described by Watson in 1975. It is found in Brazil.

References

Phaegopterina
Moths described in 1975